Ocean City Boardwalk can refer to:
Ocean City Boardwalk (Maryland) in Ocean City, Maryland
Ocean City Boardwalk (New Jersey) in Ocean City, New Jersey